Bear Cub Pond is a small lake located northwest of Downsville in Delaware County, New York. Bear Cub Pond drains southeast via an unnamed creek that flows into Wilson Hollow Brook.

See also
 List of lakes in New York

References 

Lakes of New York (state)
Lakes of Delaware County, New York